Dendrobium fleckeri, commonly known as the apricot cane orchid, is a species of epiphytic or lithophytic orchid endemic to far north Queensland, Australia. It has cylindrical pseudobulbs with two or three dark green leaves and up to four apricot-coloured or yellowish green flowers with tangled white hairs on the edge of the labellum.

Description
The side lobes are relatively large, upright and pointed and the middle lobe has three keels and dense hairs on its edges. Flowering occurs between August and January.

Taxonomy and naming
Dendrobium fleckeri was first formally described in 1937 by Herman Rupp and Cyril Tenison White and the description was published in The Queensland Naturalist. The specific epithet (fleckeri) honours Hugo Flecker, a physician, natural historian, and founding president of the North Queensland Naturalists' Club.

Distribution and habitat
The apricot cane orchid grows in trees, shrubs and boulders in mist forest between Mount Finnigan and Mount Fisher on Cape York Peninsula.

References 

fleckeri
Endemic orchids of Australia
Orchids of Queensland
Plants described in 1937
Taxa named by Cyril Tenison White
Taxa named by Herman Rupp